This is a list of DC Thomson publications; formerly D. C. Thomson & Co., of Dundee, Scotland.



Newspapers, comics and magazines
These newspapers, comics and magazines are or were published by D.C. Thomson & Co.

Current 

 110% Gaming (2014–present)
 The Beano (1938–present)
 Commando Comics (1961–present)
The Courier (1801–present)
 EPIC Magazine (2007–present)
 Evening Telegraph (1905–present)
 The People's Friend (1869–present)
 The Scots Magazine (1739–1826, 1888–1893, 1924–present)
 The Sunday Post (1936–present)
 WWE Kids Magazine (2008–present)

Former 
Adventure (1921–1961)
Annabel (1965–1981)
Animal Planet (2011–2023)
Animals & You (1998–2023)
The Beezer (1956–1990)
Beezer and Topper (1990–1993)
The Best of Beezer (1988–1996)
The Best of Topper (1988–1996)
Blue Jeans (1980–1991)
Bucky O'Hare (1992)
Buddy (1981–1983)
Bullet (1976–1978)
Bunty (1958–2001)
Buzz (1973–1975)
Champ (1984–1985)
Classic Stitches
Classics from the Comics (1996–2010)
Cracker (1975–1976)
The Crunch (1979–1980)
The Dandy (1937–2012) (renamed Dandy Xtreme between 2007–2010)
Danger Mouse (2015)
Debbie (1976–78), a girls' comic
Diana (1963–76) – a girls' comic
Emma (1978–79), a girls' comic, combined with Judy in 1979)
Evergreen (1985–2023)
The Fun Size Beano (1996–2010)
The Fun Size Dandy (1996–2010)
 Goodie Bag Mag (2003–2011)
Hoot (1985–1986)
The Hotspur (1933–59)
New Hotspur (1959–63)
 Nickelodeon Magazine (2011–2016)
The Hotspur (1963–81)
Jackie (1964–1993), a girls' comic
Judy (1960–2001)
Living Magazine (2020–2023)
The Magic Comic (1939–1941)
Mandy (1967–1991)
My Weekly
No.1 Magazine (2015–2020)
Nutty (1980–1985)
Platinum Magazine (2019–2023)
Plug (1977–1979)
The Rover (1922–1973)
Shout (1993–2023)
Shout Secrets (2008)
Shout Social (2015)
Shout Summer (2008–2010)
The Skipper (1930 to 1941)
Sparky (1965–1977)
Spike (1983–1984)
Starblazer (1979–1991)
Suzy (1982–1987)
The Topper (1953–1990)
Tracy (1979–1985), a girls' comic, combined with Judy in 1985
TV Tops (1981–1984) (originally titled Tops)
Twinkle (1968–1999)
The Vanguard (1923–1926)
The Victor (1961–1994)
Vlogmas (2017)
The Wizard (1922–1963, 1970–1978)
Warlord (1974–1986)
The Weekly News

Annuals
The annuals are normally published in time for Christmas, which is the major gift selling time of the year, usually appearing on shelves in early September. The annuals that DC Thomson have published, or still publish, over the years, include:

Current 

 70 Years of The Beano and The Dandy (1988–present)
 Animals and You (2008–present)
 The Beano Annual (1940–present)
 The Broons (1940–present)
 Classic Broons and Oor Wullie annuals (1996–present)
 The Dandy Annual (1939–present)
 Oor Wullie (1941–present)
 Storytime with Grandma (2008–present)

Former 
Bananaman (1984–1987)
The Bash Street Kids (1980–2010)
The Beezer Book (1958–2003)
Beryl the Peril (1959–1977, 1981, 1987–1988)
Black Bob (1950–1965)
Blue Jeans Annual (1970–90s)
Bunty Annual (1960–2009)
Cowboy Book For Boys (1938)
Dennis the Menace Annual (1956–2011)
Desperate Dan Annual (1955, 1979, 1991–1993)
Mandy Annual (1969–2007)
The Sparky Book (1967–1981)
The Topper Book (1955–1994)
Willie Waddle Book (1930–50s)

See also
 List of magazines published in Scotland

References

 
D. C. Thomson
Mass media in Dundee
DC Thomson publications, List
D. C. Thom